Cong Huanling (born 12 May 1978) is a Chinese rower. She competed in the women's coxless pair event at the 2004 Summer Olympics.

References

1978 births
Living people
Chinese female rowers
Olympic rowers of China
Rowers at the 2004 Summer Olympics
Asian Games medalists in rowing
Rowers at the 2002 Asian Games
Asian Games gold medalists for China
Medalists at the 2002 Asian Games
Rowers from Dalian
20th-century Chinese women
21st-century Chinese women